Tarn may refer to:

Places
 Tarn (lake), a mountain lake or pool formed in a cirque excavated by a glacier

England
 The Tarn, a park, nature reserve, and lake in Mottingham, Royal Borough of Greenwich.
 Tarn or Barnsley, South Yorkshire, England
 Tarn Crag (disambiguation), a number of hills in the English Lake District
 Tarns, Cumbria
 Tarn Wadling, a former lake near High Hesket in Cumbria

France 
 Tarn (department), a department in southwest France
 Lisle-sur-Tarn, France, a commune in the Tarn department
 Marssac-sur-Tarn, France, a commune in the Tarn département
 Tarn (river), a river in France
 Gorges du Tarn, France, a canyon along the course of the Tarn River
 Tarn-et-Garonne, a department in southwest France

United States
 Tarn Oil Field, an oil field in Alaska, U.S.

Chile 
 Mount Tarn, a summit on the southern part of the Strait of Magellan, Chile

Outer space 
 13032 Tarn, a main-belt minor planet

People 
 Aleks Tarn (born 1955), journalist and author
 Gary Tarn (born 1962), British filmmaker and composer
 Maria Dyer (née Tarn, 1803–1846), British Protestant Christian missionary to the Chinese
 Michael Tarn (born 1953), British film and television actor
 Nathaniel Tarn (born 1928), British-American poet
 Tarn Adams (born 1978), American co-creator of the video game Dwarf Fortress
 Tarn Mann, Indian writer, producer and director
 William Woodthorpe Tarn (1869–1957), 20th century British historian and author

Transport 
 HMS Tarn (P336), a Second World War British T class submarine
 Tarn Light Railway

Fiction 
 Tarn, a type of large bird ridden by characters in the Gor fiction series by John Norman

 Tarn, a Decepticon in the Transformers franchise

See also 
 Tarn Taran (disambiguation), various places
 Tarne, a spider genus of the family Salticidae (jumping spiders)